Peter Chu is an American dancer, choreographer, and teacher. Born in The Bronx and raised in Cocoa Beach, Florida, Chu is best known for performing with choreographer Crystal Pite's company Kidd Pivot, for his role as principal dancer in the music video for Christina Perri's Jar of Hearts, and for his appearance as a guest choreographer in season 9 and 10 of So You Think You Can Dance. He was the winner of the 2010 Capezio A.C.E. Award for choreographing the work, This Thought.

Chu first trained as a gymnast and cheerleader before beginning studies at Dussich Dance Studio, and advancing his studies at Dance by Holly Rock. He later graduated from The Juilliard School with a B.F.A. in Dance, where he was awarded the Hector Zaraspe Prize for Choreography.

As a performer, Chu has danced with BJM Danse (Les Ballets Jazz de Montréal), Celine Dion's A New Day, and spent seven years as a company member of Kidd Pivot Frankfurt RM.

Chu formed his own project-based dance company, called chuthis. In 2010, the company premiered Chu's work, Nothing Sticks, in New York City and Vancouver, British Columbia.

References 

American male dancers
Living people
1978 births
American choreographers